William Price Newhall (January 30, 1883 – January 3, 1950) was an American cricketer. He played seven first-class matches between 1908 and 1913. Six of these were for the Philadelphian cricket team and the other was for a combined Canada/USA team. Newhall comes from a cricketing family, as his father and four uncles all played first-class cricket, and several other members of the family also played at a lower level. On at least one occasion, they made up all the members of a team.

See also
 Young America Cricket Club

References
 Cricket Archive profile
 Cricinfo profile

1883 births
1950 deaths
Cricketers from Philadelphia
Philadelphian cricketers
American cricketers